Johnnie Johnson may refer to:

Johnnie Johnson (RAF officer) (1915–2001), Royal Air Force Second World War II flying ace and air vice-marshal
Johnnie Johnson (RAF officer, born 1917) (1917–2009), English Royal Air Force air vice-marshal and cricketer
Johnnie Johnson (musician) (1924–2005), American pianist and blues musician
Johnnie Johnson (American football) (born 1956), American football cornerback and safety

See also
Johnny Johnson (disambiguation)
John Johnson (disambiguation)